Kevin Alejandro Chávez Banda (born 9 July 1991 in Mexico City) is a Mexican-born Australian diver who won the bronze medal at the 2013 World Aquatics Championships in Barcelona at the 1 m Springboard event. Chavez competed for Australia at the 2016 Rio Olympics.

References

1991 births
Living people
Mexican male divers
Divers from Mexico City
Australian male divers
World Aquatics Championships medalists in diving
Divers at the 2016 Summer Olympics
Olympic divers of Australia
Mexican emigrants to Australia